Alldridge is a surname. Notable people with the surname include:

Peter Alldridge, British lawyer
William Alldridge (1879–1942), American machinist